Reginald Roosevelt Johnson is a former professional American football player who played tight end for seven seasons for the Denver Broncos (1991–1993), the Green Bay Packers (1994, 1997), the Philadelphia Eagles (1995), and the Kansas City Chiefs (1996).

References

1968 births
Living people
American football tight ends
Florida State Seminoles football players
Denver Broncos players
Green Bay Packers players
Philadelphia Eagles players
Kansas City Chiefs players
Players of American football from Pensacola, Florida
Birmingham Thunderbolts players